Robert Richard Anstice (1813–1853) was an English clergyman and mathematician who wrote two remarkable papers on combinatorics, published the same year he died in the Cambridge and Dublin mathematical journal. He pioneered the use of primitive roots in this field, anticipating the work of Eugen Netto on Steiner's triplets.

Anstice studied at Christ Church, Oxford where he graduated in 1835, receiving a Master's  in 1837. Nothing is known about his life in the next ten years. In 1846, he was ordained priest, and in the following year he became rector of Wigginton, Hertfordshire. He died there in 1853

References

Bibliography

External links 
 

19th-century English mathematicians
1813 births
1853 deaths